Formenti is an Italian surname. Notable people with the surname include:

 Ernesto Formenti (1927–1989), Italian boxer
 Sergio Formenti (1928–2009), Italian field hockey player

Italian-language surnames